Klemen Pucko (born 27 January 1996) is a Slovenian football defender who plays for NŠ Mura.

References

External links
Klemen Pucko at NZS 

1996 births
Living people
Slovenian footballers
Slovenia youth international footballers
Association football fullbacks
ND Mura 05 players
NK Aluminij players
NŠ Mura players
Slovenian Second League players
Slovenian PrvaLiga players